Chet Baker Big Band is an album by jazz trumpeter Chet Baker recorded in 1956 and released on the Pacific Jazz label.

The album contains three tracks performed by an eleven piece group and seven tracks played by a nine piece group.

The repertoire is a mix of standards and original compositions by Christian Chevallier and Pierre Michelot as arranged by Jimmy Heath, Michelot, Chevallier, and Phil Urso.

Reception

Lindsay Planer of Allmusic states, "The critical argument proposing that Baker's style is more akin to bop — and the residual post-bop — than the West Coast cool that he is often connected with gets tremendous validation throughout".

Track listing
 "A Foggy Day" (George Gershwin, Ira Gershwin) - 3:29
 "Mythe" (Christian Chevallier, Pierre Michelot) - 4:26
 "Worryin' the Life Out of Me" (Miff Mole, Bob Russell, Frank Signorelli) - 5:21
 "Chet" (Michelot) - 4:11
 "Not Too Slow" (Chevallier, Michelot) - 3:51
 "Phil's Blues" (Phil Urso) - 4:37
 "Darn That Dream" (Eddie DeLange, Jimmy Van Heusen) - 3:30
 "Dinah" (Harry Akst, Sam M. Lewis, Joe Young) - 4:39
 "V-Line" (Chevallier) - 3:24
 "Tenderly" (Walter Gross, Jack Lawrence) - 4:04

Personnel
On “Tenderly”, “A Foggy Day”, and “Darn That Dream”

Chet Baker, Conte Candoli, Norman Faye, trumpet; Frank Rosolino, trombone; Art Pepper, Bud Shank, alto sax; Bill Perkins, Phil Urso, tenor sax, Bobby Timmons, piano; Jimmy Bond, bass; Lawrence Marable, drums

arranged by Jimmy Heath – recorded in Los Angeles, October 26, 1956

On "Mythe”, “Chet”, “Not Too Slow”, “Phil's Blues”, “Dinah”, and “V-Line”

Chet Baker, trumpet; Bob Burgess, trombone; Fred Waters, alto sax; Phil Urso, alto, tenor, baritone sax; Bob Graf, tenor sax; Bill Hood, baritone sax; Bobby Timmons, piano; Jimmy Bond, bass; Peter Littman, drums

tracks (4, 6, 9) arr. by Christian Chevallier; (5, 8) arr. by Pierre Michelot; (7) arr. by Phil Urso – recorded in Los Angeles, October 18, 1956

On “Worrying the Life Out of Me”

Chet Baker, trumpet; Bob Burgess, trombone; Fred Waters, alto sax; Phil Urso, alto, tenor, baritone sax; Bob Graf, tenor sax; Bill Hood, baritone sax; Bobby Timmons, piano; Jimmy Bond, bass; James McKean, drums

arranged by Phil Urso – recorded in Los Angeles, October 19, 1956

References 

1956 albums
Chet Baker albums
Pacific Jazz Records albums